The John and Mary Mattson House is a historic house within the Sandy Historic District in Sandy, Utah, United States, that is individually listed on the National Register of Historic Places (NRHP).

Description
The -story brick house was built in about 1910 and is located at 239 East Main Street. . According to its NRHP nomination, the house is significant for its association with the mining, smelting, and small farm period of 1871–1910 in Sandy. It is "among the best preserved examples" of a central-block-with-projecting-bays type of house that was fairly commonly built in Sandy, and its "Victorian Eclectic detailing is expressive of the level of craftsmanship attained locally."

It was listed on the National Register of Historic Places on August 8, 1996.

See also

 National Register of Historic Places listings in Salt Lake County, Utah

References

External links

Houses on the National Register of Historic Places in Utah
Houses completed in 1910
Houses in Salt Lake County, Utah
National Register of Historic Places in Salt Lake County, Utah
Buildings and structures in Sandy, Utah
Victorian architecture in Utah